Katorse (International title: Fourteen (14)) is a television primetime series that aired on ABS-CBN from August 24, 2009, to January 8, 2010, replacing Boys Over Flowers. and was replaced by Tanging Yaman. It tells the story of a simple small-town girl who fell in love with a childhood friend who later fathers a child with her. It is loosely based on a 1980 film of the same name courtesy of Regal Films starring Dina Bonnevie, Gabby Concepcion and Alfie Anido.

Overview

Casting
The show stars 2005 Star Circle Grand Questor Erich Gonzales as teenage mom, Nene. This is Gonzales' first starring role in a primetime program. The series showcases showbiz newbies Ejay Falcon and Xian Lim in their first starring role in a primetime series. ABS-CBN picked the cast because they believe that primetime television needs to have new faces, to make it look fresh and better than the usual actors.

In early July 2009, ABS-CBN released the program's trailer, which revealed the cast of Katorse to include veteran actors Malou de Guzman (as Nene's mother) and Cherie Gil as Gabby's mother, where she plays a less villainous role. Cherie Gil and Erich Gonzales had worked together in Pieta. Gil saw a lot of potential with Erich and believes that she will go far in the showbiz industry.

Sometime in August 2009, the management added Enchong Dee as an additional main cast.

1968 film
The original Katorse starred 18-year-old Mercedes Galvez, which launched her to stardom in the late 1960s, and featured Antonio Gomez as Gabby and the late Roldan Cruz as Albert. Katorse is known for its sexy trademark “magic kamison” (magic chemise) donned by the young lead actress while out for a swim. Although there are only two male characters in the 1968 film, ABS-CBN management added a third character, played by Enchong Dee, in the television series. The film was remade in 1980 starring Dina Bonnevie.

Story and development

Synopsis
Nene is an ordinary girl from the province whose once-happy childhood turns fatally tragic as she and her wealthy childhood friend Gabby supposedly fell in love, thus causing her teenage pregnancy when they have sexual intercourse. Nene also discovers many troubles involving her family.

Cast and characters

Main cast
 Erich Gonzales as Elena "Nene" Reyes-Wenceslao
 Ejay Falcon as Gabriel "Gabby" Arcanghel
 Enchong Dee as John Joseph "Jojo" M. Wenceslao
 Xian Lim as Albert Arcanghel

Supporting cast
 Gardo Versoza as Don Anselmo Arcanghel
 Cherie Gil as Doña Margarita Arcanghel
 Malou de Guzman as Nena Reyes
 Eda Nolan as Nenita Reyes
 Charee Pineda as Marissa Ocampo
 Carmi Martin as Yvonne Madrigal-Wenceslao
 Jessy Mendiola as Bettina Godinez
 Mat Ranillo III as Alfred Wenceslao
 Bangs Garcia as Shakira
 Dino Imperial as Dilbert 
 Cy Mistosamente as Tommy Reyes-Wenceslao

Guest cast
 Jane Oineza as young Nene
 John Manalo as young Gabriel
 Joshua Dionisio as young Albert
 Jhoana Marie Tan as Doray
 Tommy Abuel as Mr. King
 Alexis Socorro L. Reyes as Dra. Julie (Ambassador of Autism Society Philippines) & (Principal Policy of San Lorenzo Ruiz de Manila School of Marikina City)
 Maritess Joaquin as Theresa Ocampo
 Martin del Rosario as Macoy
 Kier Legaspi as Ramon (Jojo's Uncle)
 Emily Loren as Guidance Principal (Episode 85)
 Julia Montes as Nellie (Final Episode 100)
 Auriette Divina as Mayumi Crisostomo (Fake Girlfriend of Jojo)
 Michael "Jamike" Jarin as Dr. Castro (Gabby's Doctor) (Current Head Coach of San Beda Red Lions on NCAA)
 Marvin Yap as Maynard
 Juan Rodrigo as Paeng Reyes
 Marissa Delgado as Doña Remedios Madrigal

Reception

Soundtrack
The program's theme song, especially for Gabby and Nene, is "Tamis ng Unang Halik" ("Sweetness of First Kiss") sung by Juris of MYMP originally done by Kristina Paner. The song "My Love is Here" sung by Erik Santos is also featured in the show as a theme for Jojo and Nene.

Postponement
The show was originally scheduled to air in early June 8, 2009, but was postponed as the producers reported having encountered shooting problems because of the weather. Because of this, the management have decided to replace Katorse's timeslot with The Wedding, a romantic-comedy series starring Anne Curtis, Derek Ramsay and Zanjoe Marudo.

Teenage pregnancy issue
MTRCB has shown concerns due to the show's main theme: teenage pregnancy. They claim that this matter is to be taken seriously and can easily influence viewers. They also referred to The Wedding, another program by ABS-CBN in which the character of Hiyasmin Neri have become pregnant at a young age. MTRCB proclaim that these shows are making teenage pregnancy a stereotype on everyday lives. Although frowned upon, MTRCB have decided that they will take a closer look on these shows.

International release

See also
List of programs broadcast by ABS-CBN
List of telenovelas of ABS-CBN
List of shows previously aired by ABS-CBN

References

External links
 ABS-CBN's Katorse
 Katorse
 Katorse Multiply
 

ABS-CBN drama series
Television series by Dreamscape Entertainment Television
2009 Philippine television series debuts
2010 Philippine television series endings
Philippine romance television series
Live action television shows based on films
Filipino-language television shows
Television shows set in the Philippines